The long-billed cuckoo (Chrysococcyx megarhynchus) is a species of cuckoo in the family Cuculidae. Found in the Aru Islands and New Guinea, its natural habitats are subtropical or tropical moist lowland forests.

References

long-billed cuckoo
Birds of New Guinea
long-billed cuckoo
long-billed cuckoo
Taxonomy articles created by Polbot
Taxobox binomials not recognized by IUCN